William Meade Fishback (November 5, 1831February 9, 1903) was the 17th Governor of Arkansas and U.S. Senator-elect for Arkansas.

Early life
Fishback was born in Jeffersonton, Virginia, in Culpeper County, Virginia, the son of Sophia Ann (Yates) and Frederick Fishback. He graduated with a law degree from the University of Virginia in 1855.

Career
In 1857, Fishback moved to Springfield, Illinois, where he was admitted to the bar and briefly practiced law. During his time in Springfield, he came into contact with Abraham Lincoln and handled foreclosure proceedings for his firm, Lincoln & Herndon. He moved to the frontier region of Sebastian County, Arkansas in 1858 and began practicing in Greenwood shortly thereafter. In 1861, Fishback was elected to the Arkansas Secession Convention as a pro-Union delegate. After the convention voted in favor of secession, he fled to Missouri and took an oath of allegiance to the Union. Fishback followed the Union army back into Arkansas in 1863 and was appointed Colonel of the 4th Arkansas Cavalry (USA). He raised 900 soldiers, although his efforts to restore Arkansas into the Union prevented him from leading the regiment. Upon his return to Arkansas, Fishback established a pro-Union newspaper called The Unconditional Union, urging voters to ratify the new state constitution that abolished slavery and repudiated secession. In December 1863, he represented 17-year-old David Owen Dodd, who was convicted of spying.

Fishback and Elisha Baxter were selected to represent Arkansas in the United States Senate in 1864, but their admission was blocked in February 1865 as Arkansas had not yet been readmitted into the Union. After serving as a federal treasury agent following the conclusion of the Civil War, Fishback returned to Sebastian County, reopened a law office in Fort Smith and spent the next decade building his practice into one of the most prosperous in western Arkansas.

Fishback was a delegate to the 1874 Arkansas Constitutional Convention. He served as a member of the Arkansas House of Representatives from 1871 to 1881. He introduced what came to be known as the "Fishback Amendment", now known as Amendment 1 (codified as Article 20) of the Arkansas Constitution. This amendment prohibited the state authorities from paying the Holford railroad aid and levee bonds. Failure to pay the Holford debt created credit problems for the state that lasted well into the 20th century.

On September 5, 1892, Fishback was elected Governor of Arkansas. Fishback's administration focused on changing the national image of the state. During his term, the St. Francis River levee district was formed. Fishback served as governor until 1895 when he left public office and worked attempting to attract business to the state.

Death
Fishback died of a stroke. Fishback is buried at Oak Cemetery in Fort Smith, Arkansas.

References

External links
 
 
 Governor William Meade Fishback, National Governors Association

Democratic Party governors of Arkansas
Democratic Party members of the Arkansas House of Representatives
People of Arkansas in the American Civil War
United States Army officers
1831 births
1903 deaths
People from Culpeper County, Virginia
People from Greenwood, Arkansas
University of Virginia School of Law alumni
19th-century American politicians